Andrew Tristem (born 1968) is an author and journalist who has written widely for The Sunday Times, Sunday Express and Metro, among many other publications. 

Schooled at Gillotts School and King James's College (now The Henley College) in Henley-on-Thames, Tristem graduated from the University of Warwick with an MSc in Management Science and Operational Research, and the London School of Journalism where he graduated summa cum laude with a Postgraduate Diploma in Journalism. He started his journalism career at the Western Gazette in Somerset before moving to the Hampstead & Highgate Express series in London where he worked as a staff reporter and news editor. 

Tristem now works as a senior press officer at Public Health England and writes novels in his spare time. He lives in Henley-on-Thames in Oxfordshire with his wife Rebecca and son. The Incidental Murderer is his first novel, followed by Meat Club.

References

1968 births
Living people
Alumni of the University of Warwick
English male novelists
21st-century British novelists
English male journalists
People from Henley-on-Thames
Alumni of the London School of Journalism